Roggeman is a surname. Notable people with the surname include: 

Inge Roggeman (born 1981), Belgian cyclist
Tomas Roggeman (born 1986), Belgian politician
Tom Roggeman (1931–2018), American football player
Willem Roggeman (born 1935), Belgian poet, novelist, and art critic
Willy Roggeman (born 1934), Belgian writer and jazz musician